Li Yaofeng (born 16 November 1997) is a Chinese equestrian. He competed in the 2020 Summer Olympics.

References

1997 births
Living people
People from Dongguan
Equestrians at the 2014 Summer Youth Olympics
Equestrians at the 2020 Summer Olympics
Chinese male equestrians
Olympic equestrians of China
Show jumping riders